The Ligurian regional election of 2010 took place on 28–29 March 2010.

The incumbent President Claudio Burlando of the centre-left Democratic Party (PD) faced Sandro Biasotti, backed by The People of Freedom (PdL) and Northern League Liguria. Biasotti was President of the Region from 2000 to 2005, when he was defeated by Burlando. The Union of the Centre (UdC), a traditionally centre-right political force, supported the centre-left candidate Burlando.

Burlando secured a second consecutive term, but the PdL came out as the largest party in the region.

Electoral system 
Regional elections in Liguria were ruled by the "Tatarella law" (approved in 1995), which provided for a mixed electoral system: four fifths of the regional councilors were elected in provincial constituencies by proportional representation, using the largest remainder method with a droop quota and open lists, while the residual votes and the unassigned seats were grouped into a "single regional constituency", where the whole ratios and the highest remainders were divided with the Hare method among the provincial party lists; one fifth of the council seats instead was reserved for regional lists and assigned with a majoritarian system: the leader of the regional list that scored the highest number of votes was elected to the presidency of the Region while the other candidates were elected regional councilors.

A threshold of 3% had been established for the provincial lists, which, however, could still have entered the regional council if the regional list to which they were connected had scored at least 5% of valid votes.

The panachage was also allowed: the voter can indicate a candidate for the presidency but prefer a provincial list connected to another candidate.

Parties and candidates

Results

Results by province and capital city

References

Elections in Liguria
2010 elections in Italy